.xxx (pronounced "dot triple-ecks" or "dot ecks ecks ecks") is a sponsored top-level domain (sTLD) intended as a voluntary option for pornographic sites on the Internet. The sponsoring organization is the International Foundation for Online Responsibility (IFFOR). The registry is operated by ICM Registry LLC. The ICANN Board voted to approve the sTLD on 18 March 2011. It went into operation on 15 April 2011.

The TLD entered its sunrise period on 7 September 2011 at 16:00 UTC; the sunrise period ended 28 October 2011. Landrush period lasted from 8 November through 25 November, and general availability commenced on 6 December 2011.

Background
A gTLD (generic top-level domain) for sexually explicit material was proposed as one tool for dealing with the conflict between those who wish to provide and access such material through the Internet, and those who wish to prevent access to it, either by children and adolescents, or by employees at their workplaces.

Advocates of the idea argue that it will be easier for parents and employers to block the entire TLD, rather than using more complex and error-prone content-based filtering, without imposing any restrictions on those who wish to access it. Editors of explicit content sites, however, were afraid that the use of a single TLD like .xxx would also make it easier for search engines to block all of their content.

Critics of the idea argue that because there is no requirement for providers of explicit content to use the TLD, sexually explicit material will still be commonplace in other domains, making it ineffectual at restricting access, and simply creating a new "landrush" as registrants of .com domains hosting explicit material attempt to duplicate their registrations in the .xxx domain, competing with operators who hope to register desirable names unavailable in other TLDs. There is also concern that the existence of .xxx will lead to legislation making its use mandatory for sexually explicit material, leading to legal conflicts over the definition of "sexually explicit", free speech rights, and jurisdiction.

There were also early indications that .xxx domain names will be registered not with the intent to focus on pornographic content, but to use the adult connotations as a benefit to a marketing strategy. An example is the registration of kite.xxx, which is aimed at the extreme sport of kitesurfing, thus benefiting from sexual connotations and innuendo for humor and promotional purposes.  Another example of a .xxx domain name being registered without a focus on pornographic content was the registration of popebenedict.xxx, which contained pro-Islamic content despite being named after Pope Benedict XVI.

Proposal by ICM Registry
The .XXX TLD was first proposed in 2000 by ICM Registry and resubmitted in 2004, but it faced strong opposition from politicians and conservative groups.

ICANN announced on 1 June 2005 a preliminary approval of .xxx as an sTLD similar to .aero, .travel, etc. ICM said it would charge $60/year for domains.  In December 2005, discussions about the implementation of .xxx were taken off the agenda of ICANN Governmental Advisory Committee (GAC), placing its future in doubt. In its March 2006 meeting, the GAC formulated a letter of concern to the ICANN board about .xxx. On 10 May 2006, ICANN reversed the approval. On 6 January 2007, ICANN put up for public comment a revised proposal following changes to the policy of the ICM registry including the policing of any site that signs up to use the .xxx registry. On 30 March 2007, the ICANN board again rejected the .xxx proposal for the third time.

On 6 June 2008, in accordance with ICANN bylaws, ICM filed an application with the International Centre for Dispute Resolution for an independent review challenging ICANN's decision.  The filing became ICDR Case No. 50 117 T 00224 08, and in September 2009, a live hearing was held in Washington, DC, where both sides submitted documentary evidence and witness testimony. on 19 February 2010, the ICDR's independent review panel – consisting of Stephen M. Schwebel, Jan Paulsson and Dickran Tevrizian – issued its declaration. The panel found that the application for the ".XXX sTLD met the required sponsorship criteria," and that "the Board’s reconsideration of that finding was not consistent with the application of neutral, objective and fair documented policy". At the ICANN meeting in Nairobi in March 2010 the board resolved to consider "process options". A 45-day public comment was opened on 26 March 2010. At the Brussels ICANN meeting in June 2010, the ICANN board resolved to restart the process, including renewed due diligence and GAC consultations.

On 18 March 2011, ICANN's board approved the execution of the registry agreement with ICM for the .xxx sponsored top level domain. The vote was nine in favor, four against, with three abstentions.

ICM is expected to make over $200 million a year, with 3 to 5 million domain registrations, as companies are anticipated to defensively register their domains.

Opposition

Manwin suits
On 16 November 2011, Manwin International, a pornography company that operates a large number of popular adult websites including YouPorn, filed a request for a second ICANN Independent Review Proceeding. In the request, Manwin asks that the .xxx delegation be voided, or, if not, put up to competition on renewal.

On the same day Manwin, together with adult film studio Digital Playground, filed a suit in the Central District of California against ICM alleging antitrust and competition violations. Among the claims in the suit are that ICANN provided "no competitive process for the award of the .XXX registry contract" and that ICM CEO Stuart Lawley "has announced that he expects to be able (and intends) to prevent the establishment of any other (potentially competing) adult-content TLDs, including through a contractual promise by ICANN not to approve such TLDs".

On 14 August 2012, Judge Philip S. Gutierrez granted in part and denied in part ICANN's motion to dismiss Manwin's claims and allowed the case against ICANN to move forward. On 10 May 2013, the case was voluntarily dismissed by the parties, likely due to private settlement.

Free Speech Coalition
The Free Speech Coalition opposed the domain, arguing it would "harm the adult entertainment business" by inviting censorship and blocking, while raising money for ICM without considering the "best interests of the industry".

Alternative implementations
Starting in 2005, there was an alternative implementation of .xxx by New.net, a private domain registration service unaffiliated with ICANN, via an alternative DNS root. New.net no longer offers domain names under this unofficial TLD.

Another unofficial .xxx TLD was previously available through the alternative DNS root system administered by the now-defunct AlterNIC.

References

External links
 IANA:  whois information
 W3C: Why Using TLDs for Filtering is Ineffective, Harmful, and Unnecessary
 ICANN: ICM v. ICANN
 ICANN: 18 March 2011 Draft Rationale for Approving Registry Agreement with ICM’s for .XXX sTLD
 ICANN: Chronological History of ICM’s Involvement with ICANN
 Global Arbitration Review: Panel makes internet history

Computer-related introductions in 2011
Erotica and pornography websites
Sponsored top-level domains
Top-level domains

sv:.xxx